Cliffs of Freedom is a 2019 independent historical drama romance film based on Marianne Metropoulos novel Daughter of Destiny. Produced by Casey Cannon and Metropoulos, the film is the directorial debut film by Van Ling from a screenplay by Ling, Metropoulos, and Kevin Bernhardt. It stars Tania Raymonde, Jan Uddin, Raza Jaffrey, Patti LuPone, and Christopher Plummer.

The film was released in the United States on March 1, 2019 by Round Hill Media.

Plot 

The film is a story of an ill-fated romance between a young and beautiful Greek village girl and a conflicted Turkish officer during the dawn of the Greek War of Independence against the Ottoman Empire in 1821. Twenty-year-old Anna Christina (Tania Raymonde) is smitten by Colonel Tariq (Jan Uddin), a rising star in the Turkish army who has growing doubts about his countrymen's brutal methods of governance, and who had once spared her life on a cliff-top when she was a child. However, their budding romance brings tragedy to her family and her village.

Swearing revenge against the Turks, Christina joins the Greek rebellion and inadvertently becomes a local symbol of the Greek resistance movement, inspiring her countrymen and attracting the ire of the Turks, who place a bounty on her head. Having believed that she could leave her feelings behind, Christina must face off against the man who still loves her and wants to keep her safe, but who has now been tasked with her capture. Their encounters and skirmishes inevitably lead to a tragic confrontation during a pivotal battle between the Greeks and Turks that will change the course of history.

Cast 

 Khalah Mitchell as Harem Dancer

Production

Filming 
Principal photography began on October 12, 2016, in Albuquerque, New Mexico, with Cory Geryak serving as cinematographer. Filming wrapped on January 10, 2017. In June 2017, George Kallis was revealed to be scoring the film.

Release

Box office 
The film was released in the United States on March 1, 2019 by Round Hill Media, grossing $16,350 on its opening weekend. As of April 20, 2019, Cliffs of Freedom has grossed an estimated $72,476 in North America and $228,336 in other territories, for a worldwide total of $300,842.

Critical response 
Michael Ordoña of the Los Angeles Times gave a mixed review by stating "Cliffs of Freedom is a bit rocky, but takes its leap in earnest. The game production does its best with limited resources, thanks, in part, to an impressive supporting cast. Apart from Christopher Plummer, it boasts the likes of Patti Lupone, Kevin Corrigan, and Billy Zane in the — shall we say — Billy Zane role: the smarmy, traitorous Greek collaborator with an eye for Anna Christina; one half-expects him to declare, "I make my own luck!". The dialogue is often stiff, the action and plotting unlikely, making the romance hard to swallow. The appealing Jan Uddin and Tania Raymonde do generate enough chemistry in their fleeting time together to keep the proposition afloat. However, the climactic moment, though heavily telegraphed, will leave many scratching their heads."

References

External links 
 
 
 

2010s historical romance films
2019 directorial debut films
2019 films
2019 independent films
2019 romantic drama films
American historical romance films
American independent films
American romantic drama films
2010s English-language films
Films based on American novels
Films scored by George Kallis
Films set in Greece
Films shot in New Mexico
Greece in fiction
2010s Greek-language films
Romance films based on actual events
2019 multilingual films
American multilingual films
2010s American films